Sybra schurmanni is a species of beetle in the family Cerambycidae. It was described by Breuning in 1983.

References

schurmanni
Beetles described in 1983